Olga Danilović and Tamara Zidanšek were the defending champions, but chose not to participate this year.

Hayley Carter and Luisa Stefani won the title, defeating Dalila Jakupović and Sabrina Santamaria in the final, 6–3, 7–6(7–4).

Seeds

Draw

Draw

References

External links
Main Draw

Tashkent Open - Doubles
2019 Tashkent Open